Arbaclofen placarbil (also known as XP19986) is a prodrug of R-baclofen. Arbaclofen placarbil possesses more favorable pharmacokinetic profile than baclofen, with less fluctuations in plasma drug levels. It was being developed as a potential treatment for patients with GERD and spasticity due to multiple sclerosis; however, in May 2013 XenoPort announced the termination of development because of unsuccessful results in phase III clinical trials.

It is being developed as an addiction medicine to treat alcoholism.  It is also studied as a potential therapeutic for some autistic subjects.

See also
 Gabapentin enacarbil
 Lesogaberan

References

Abandoned drugs
Amino acids
Calcium channel blockers
Chloroarenes
GABA analogues
GABAB receptor agonists
Prodrugs